Cuscuta reflexa, the giant dodder  or ulan ulan, is one of 100-170 species in the genus Cuscuta, and is common in the Indian subcontinent and the Greater Himalayas and as far south as Malaysia and Indonesia. This parasitic plant species is a leafless twined sprawling thin vine that grows over a host plant, including large trees with garlands hanging down from the canopy as much as thirtythree feet (ten meters). Flowers are small, bell shaped and white in colour with yellow filaments. Fruits and seeds are produced from the flower.

Gallery

References

reflexa